Spy Island may refer to:

 Spy Island, a fictional island in the online role-playing game Poptropica
 Spy Island, one of four artificial islands in the Beaufort Sea, where exploratory oil wells are planned to be drilled